João Pedro Moreira Resende (born 26 March 2003) is a Portuguese professional footballer who plays as a forward for Benfica B.

International career
Resende has represented Portugal at youth international level.

Career statistics

Club

Honours
Benfica
Campeonato Nacional de Juniores: 2021–22
 UEFA Youth League: 2021–22
Under-20 Intercontinental Cup: 2022

References

2003 births
Living people
People from Fafe
Portuguese footballers
Portugal youth international footballers
Association football forwards
Liga Portugal 2 players
AD Fafe players
Vitória S.C. players
S.L. Benfica B players
Sportspeople from Braga District